Dutton House may refer to:

in the United States (by state)

Dutton–Waller Raised Tybee Cottage, Tybee Island, Georgia, NRHP-listed
Dutton–Small House, Vassalboro, Maine, listed on the NRHP in Kennebec County, Maine
Dutton–Holden Homestead, Billerica, Massachusetts, NRHP-listed
James B. Dutton House, Lapeer, Michigan, listed on the NRHP in Lapeer County, Michigan 
Bellinger–Dutton House, Middleburgh, New York, NRHP-listed
Dutton House (Shelburne, Vermont), an exhibition house

See also
Dutton Hotel, Stagecoach Station, Jolon, California, listed on the NRHP in Monterey County, California